Oliver John Hassell-Collins (born 17 January 1999) is an English professional rugby union player who primarily plays wing for London Irish in the Gallagher Premiership. He has also represented England at international level, having made his test debut against Scotland during the 2023 Six Nations Championship. Hassell-Collins has previously played for clubs such as Rosslyn Park in the past.

Club career
Hassell-Collins started to play rugby as a child at local club Newbury R.F.C. where he was coached by his father prior to joining the academy of London Irish at the age of sixteen. On 27 October 2018 he scored a try on his club debut in a RFU Championship match against Cornish Pirates. At the end of that season London Irish were promoted back to the Premiership.

International career
In 2017 Hassell-Collins played for the England under-18 team on their tour of South Africa. He competed for the England under-20 side in the 2019 Six Nations Under 20s Championship and was also a member of the squad that finished fifth at the 2019 World Rugby Under 20 Championship. That summer also saw him represent the England Sevens team at the 2019 Paris Sevens.

In June 2021 Hassell-Collins received his first call-up by coach Eddie Jones to the senior squad for a training camp and he was called up again for the 2022 Six Nations Championship. He was included in the squad for the 2023 Six Nations Championship by new coach Steve Borthwick and on 4 February 2023 made his debut starting in their opening round defeat to Scotland.

References

External links

1999 births
Living people
English rugby union players
England international rugby union players
England international rugby sevens players
London Irish players
Rugby union wings
People educated at St. Bartholomew's School